Keras is an open-source software library that provides a Python interface for artificial neural networks. Keras acts as an interface for the TensorFlow library.

Up until version 2.3, Keras supported multiple backends, including TensorFlow, Microsoft Cognitive Toolkit, Theano, and PlaidML. As of version 2.4, only TensorFlow is supported.  Designed to enable fast experimentation with deep neural networks, it focuses on being user-friendly, modular, and extensible. It was developed as part of the research effort of project ONEIROS (Open-ended Neuro-Electronic Intelligent Robot Operating System), and its primary author and maintainer is François Chollet, a Google engineer. Chollet is also the author of the Xception deep neural network model.

Features
Keras contains numerous implementations of commonly used neural-network building blocks such as layers, objectives, activation functions, optimizers, and a host of tools to make working with image and text data easier to simplify the coding necessary for writing deep neural network code. The code is hosted on GitHub, and community support forums include the GitHub issues page, and a Slack channel.

In addition to standard neural networks, Keras has support for convolutional and recurrent neural networks. It supports other common utility layers like dropout, batch normalization, and pooling.

Keras allows users to productize deep models on smartphones (iOS and Android), on the web, or on the Java Virtual Machine. It also allows use of distributed training of deep-learning models on clusters of Graphics processing units (GPU) and tensor processing units (TPU).

See also
 Comparison of deep-learning software

References

External links

Keras on GitHub

Deep learning software
Free statistical software
Python (programming language) scientific libraries
Software using the Apache license